The Tibetan script is a segmental writing system (abugida) of Indic origin used to write certain Tibetic languages, including Tibetan, Dzongkha, Sikkimese, Ladakhi, Jirel and Balti. It has also been used for some non-Tibetic languages in close cultural contact with Tibet, such as Thakali. The printed form is called uchen script while the hand-written cursive form used in everyday writing is called umê script. This writing system is used across the Himalayas, and Tibet.

The script is closely linked to a broad ethnic Tibetan identity, spanning across areas in India, Nepal, Bhutan and Tibet. The Tibetan script is of Brahmic origin from the Gupta script and is ancestral to scripts such as Meitei, Lepcha, Marchen and the multilingual ʼPhags-pa script.

History
According to Tibetan historiography, the Tibetan script was introduced by Thonmi Sambhota in the first half of the 7th century, mainly for the codification of the sacred Buddhist texts. From a contemporary academic perspective, this is merely a legend invented in the second half of the 11th century (cf. Miller 1963; Róna-Tas 1985: 183–303; Zeisler 2005). New research and writings suggest that there were one or more Tibetan scripts in use prior to the introduction of the current script by Songtsen Gampo and Thonmi Sambhota. The Dunhuang manuscripts are key evidence for this hypothesis.

Three orthographic standardisations were developed. The most important, an official orthography aimed to facilitate the translation of Buddhist scriptures, emerged during the early 9th century. Standard orthography has not altered since then, while the spoken language has changed by, for example, losing complex consonant clusters. As a result, in all modern Tibetan dialects and in particular in the Standard Tibetan of Lhasa, there is a great divergence between current spelling (which still reflects the 9th-century spoken Tibetan) and current pronunciation. This divergence is the basis of an argument in favour of spelling reform, to write Tibetan as it is pronounced; for example, writing Kagyu instead of Bka'-rgyud.

The nomadic Amdo Tibetan and the western dialects of Ladakhi, as well as Balti, come very close to the Old Tibetan spellings. But the grammar of these varieties has considerably changed. To write the modern varieties according to the classical orthography and grammar of Classical Tibetan would be the same as to write Italian according to that of Latin, or to write Hindi according to that of Sanskrit. However, modern Buddhist elites in the Indian subcontinent insisted the classical orthography should not be altered even when used for lay purposes. This became an obstacle for many modern Tibetic languages to modernize or to introduce a written tradition. Amdo Tibetan was one of a few examples where the Buddhist elites initiated a spelling reform. A spelling reform in Ladakhi was so controversial, however, partly because it was first initiated by Christian missionaries.

Description

Basic alphabet 
In the Tibetan script, the syllables are written from left to right. Syllables are separated by a tsek (་); since many Tibetan words are monosyllabic, this mark often functions almost as a space. Spaces are not used to divide words.

The Tibetan alphabet has thirty basic letters, sometimes known as "radicals", for consonants. As in other Indic scripts, each consonant letter assumes an inherent vowel; in the Tibetan script it is /a/. The letter  is also the base for dependent vowel marks.

Although some Tibetan dialects are tonal, the language had no tone at the time of the script's invention, and there are no dedicated symbols for tone. However, since tones developed from segmental features, they can usually be correctly predicted by the archaic spelling of Tibetan words.

Consonant clusters

One aspect of the Tibetan script is that the consonants can be written either as radicals or they can be written in other forms, such as subscript and superscript forming consonant clusters.

To understand how this works, one can look at the radical  /ka/ and see what happens when it becomes  /kra/ or  /rka/. In both cases, the symbol for  /ka/ is used, but when the  /ra/ is in the middle of the consonant and vowel, it is added as a subscript.  On the other hand, when the  /ra/ comes before the consonant and vowel, it is added as a superscript.  /ra/ actually changes form when it is above most other consonants; thus  rka.  However, an exception to this is the cluster  /rɲa/.  Similarly, the consonants  /wa/,  /ra/, and  /ja/ change form when they are beneath other consonants; thus  /kwa/;  /kra/;  /kja/.

Besides being written as subscripts and superscripts, some consonants can also be placed in prescript, postscript, or post-postscript positions. For instance, the consonants  /ʰka/,  /ʰta/,  /ʰpa/,  /ma/ and  /a/ can be used in the prescript position to the left of other radicals, while the position after a radical (the postscript position), can be held by the ten consonants  /ʰka/,  /na/,  /ʰpa/,  /ʰta/,  /ma/,  /a/,  /ra/,  /ŋa/,  /sa/, and  /la/. The third position, the post-postscript position is solely for the consonants  /ʰta/ and  /sa/.

Head letters
The superscript position above a radical is reserved for the consonants  /ra/,  /la/, and  /sa/.

When  /ra/,  /la/, and  /sa/ are in superscript position with  /ka/,  /tʃa/,  /ta/,  /pa/ and  /tsa/, there are no changes in the sound in Central Lhasa Tibetan. In that language,they look and sound like:
 /ka/,  /ta/,  /pa/,  /tsa/
 /ka/,  /tʃa/,  /ta/,  /pa/, 
 /ka/,  /tʃa/,  /ta/,  /pa/,  /tsa/
When  /ra/,  /la/, and  /sa/ are in superscript position with  /ʰka/,  /ʰtʃa/,  /ʰta/,  /ʰpa/ and  /ʰtsa/, they lose their aspiration and become voiced in Central Lhasa Tibetan. In that language,they look and sound like:
 /ga/,  /d͡ʒa/,  /da/,  /ba/,  /dza/
 /ga/,  /d͡ʒa/,  /da/,  /ba/, 
 /ga/,  /d͡ʒa/,  /da/,  /ba/,  /dza/
When  /ra/,  /la/, and  /sa/ are in superscript position with  /ŋa/,  /ɲa/,  /na/ and  /ma/, the nasal sound gets high in Central Lhasa Tibetan. In that language,they look and sound like:
 /ŋa/,  /ɲa/,  /na/,  /ma/
 /ŋa/,   /ma/
 /ŋa/,  /ɲa/,  /na/,  /ma/

Sub-joined letters
The subscript position under a radical is for the consonants  /ja/,  /ra/,  /la/, and  /wa/.

Vowel marks

The vowels used in the alphabet are  /a/,  /i/,  /u/,  /e/, and  /o/. While the vowel /a/ is included in each consonant, the other vowels are indicated by marks; thus   /ka/,  /ki/,  /ku/,  /ke/,  /ko/.  The vowels  /i/,  /e/, and  /o/ are placed above consonants as diacritics, while the vowel  /u/ is placed underneath consonants. Old Tibetan included a reversed form of the mark for /i/, the gigu 'verso', of uncertain meaning. There is no distinction between long and short vowels in written Tibetan, except in loanwords, especially transcribed from the Sanskrit.

Numerical digits

Punctuation marks

Extended use

The Tibetan alphabet, when used to write other languages such as Balti, Chinese and Sanskrit, often has additional and/or modified graphemes taken from the basic Tibetan alphabet to represent different sounds.

Extended alphabet

In Balti, consonants ka, ra are represented by reversing the letters  (ka, ra) to give  (qa, ɽa).
The Sanskrit "retroflex consonants" ṭa, ṭha, ḍa, ṇa, ṣa are represented in Tibetan by reversing the letters  (ta, tha, da, na, sha) to give  (Ta, Tha, Da, Na, Sa).
It is a classical rule to transliterate Sanskrit ca, cha, ja, jha, to Tibetan  (tsa, tsha, dza, dzha), respectively. Nowadays,  (ca, cha, ja, jha) can also be used.

Extended vowel marks and modifiers

Romanization and transliteration

Romanization and transliteration of the Tibetan script is the representation of the Tibetan script in the Latin script. Multiple Romanization and transliteration systems have been created in recent years, but do not fully represent the true phonetic sound. While the Wylie transliteration system is widely used to Romanize Standard Tibetan, others include the Library of Congress system and the IPA-based transliteration (Jacques 2012).

Below is a table with Tibetan letters and different Romanization and transliteration system for each letter, listed below systems are: Wylie transliteration (W),  Tibetan pinyin (TP), Dzongkha phonetic (DP), ALA-LC Romanization (A) and THL Simplified Phonetic Transcription (THL).

Input method and keyboard layout

Tibetan

The first version of Microsoft Windows to support the Tibetan keyboard layout is MS Windows Vista. The layout has been available in Linux since September 2007. In Ubuntu 12.04, one can install Tibetan language support through Dash / Language Support / Install/Remove Languages, the input method can be turned on from Dash / Keyboard Layout, adding Tibetan keyboard layout. The layout applies the similar layout as in Microsoft Windows.

Mac OS-X introduced Tibetan Unicode support with OS-X version 10.5 and later, now with three different keyboard layouts available: Tibetan-Wylie, Tibetan QWERTY and Tibetan-Otani.

Dzongkha

The Dzongkha keyboard layout scheme is designed as a simple means for inputting Dzongkha text on computers. This keyboard layout was standardized by the Dzongkha Development Commission (DDC) and the Department of Information Technology (DIT) of the Royal Government of Bhutan in 2000.

It was updated in 2009 to accommodate additional characters added to the Unicode & ISO 10646 standards since the initial version. Since the arrangement of keys essentially follows the usual order of the Dzongkha and Tibetan alphabet, the layout can be quickly learned by anyone familiar with this alphabet. Subjoined (combining) consonants are entered using the Shift key.

The Dzongkha (dz) keyboard layout is included in Microsoft Windows, Android, and most distributions of Linux as part of XFree86.

Unicode

Tibetan was originally one of the scripts in the first version of the Unicode Standard in 1991, in the Unicode block U+1000–U+104F. However, in 1993, in version 1.1, it was removed (the code points it took up would later be used for the Burmese script in version 3.0). The Tibetan script was re-added in July, 1996 with the release of version 2.0.

The Unicode block for Tibetan is U+0F00–U+0FFF. It includes letters, digits and various punctuation marks and special symbols used in religious texts:

See also 
 Tibetan calligraphy
 Tibetan Braille
 Dzongkha Braille
 Tibetan typefaces
 Wylie transliteration
 Tibetan pinyin
 THDL Simplified Phonetic Transcription
 Tise, input method for Tibetan script
 Limbu script

Notes

References

Citations

Sources 

 Asher, R. E. ed.  The Encyclopedia of Language and Linguistics.  Tarrytown, NY: Pergamon Press, 1994.  10 vol.
 Beyer, Stephan V. (1993). The Classical Tibetan Language. Reprinted by Delhi: Sri Satguru.
 Chamberlain, Bradford Lynn. 2008. Script Selection for Tibetan-related Languages in Multiscriptal Environments. International Journal of the Sociology of Language 192:117–132.
 Csoma de Kőrös, Alexander. (1983). A Grammar of the Tibetan Language. Reprinted by Delhi: Sri Satguru.
 Csoma de Kőrös, Alexander (1980–1982). Sanskrit-Tibetan-English Vocabulary. 2 vols. Reprinted by Delhi: Sri Satguru.
 Daniels, Peter T. and William Bright.  The World's Writing Systems.  New York: Oxford University Press, 1996.
 Das, Sarat Chandra: "The Sacred and Ornamental Characters of Tibet". Journal of the Asiatic Society of Bengal, vol. 57 (1888), pp. 41–48 and 9 plates.
 Das, Sarat Chandra. (1996). An Introduction to the Grammar of the Tibetan Language. Reprinted by Delhi: Motilal Banarsidass.
 Jacques, Guillaume 2012. A new transcription system for Old and Classical Tibetan, Linguistics of the Tibeto-Burman Area, 35.3:89-96. 
 Jäschke, Heinrich August. (1989). Tibetan Grammar. Corrected by Sunil Gupta. Reprinted by Delhi: Sri Satguru.

External links
  Tibetan Calligraphy —Online guide for writing Tibetan script.
 Elements of the Tibetan writing system.
 Unicode area U0F00-U0FFF, Tibetan script (162KB)
 Encoding Model of the Tibetan Script in the UCS
 Digital Tibetan —Online resource for the digitalization of Tibetan.
 Tibetan Scripts, Fonts & Related Issues—THDL articles on Unicode font issues; free cross-platform OpenType fonts—Unicode compatible.
 Free Tibetan Fonts Project
 Ancient Scripts: Tibetan

 
Dzongkha language
Brahmic scripts
Writing systems without word boundaries